Liberation Institute is a Christian academic institution located in Calamba, Misamis Occidental, Philippines. The institute currently offers Pre-Elementary, Grade School, and High School.

History 
The school was founded on March 18, 1946 by members of the United Church of Christ in the Philippines.  The school was named as such because the founding was briefly before the Philippines became an independent nation (July 4, 1946)1, hence the name "Liberation." It was recognized by the Philippine government as an institution of higher education in the same year that it was founded, with recognition No. 165.

Liberation Christian School 
In 1996, the school celebrated its golden anniversary and in the following year, its name was changed to Liberation Christian School. However, due to public clamor for the retention of the old name, the administration finally decided to restore again the name, Liberation Institute.

Notable alumni
 Ricardo T. Gloria - DOST Secretary (1992–1994), and Department of Education, Culture, and Sports (DECS) Secretary (1994–1997).
 Dr. Ben S. Malayang III - President, Silliman University

See also
Calamba, Misamis Occidental

References

Educational institutions established in 1946
Schools in Misamis Oriental
High schools in the Philippines
Protestant schools in the Philippines
1946 establishments in the Philippines